Richard Annesley, 3rd Baron Altham (1655 – 19 November 1701), styled The Honourable Richard Annesley between 1681 and 1700, was Dean of Exeter between
1681 and 1701.

Richard Annesley was the son of Arthur Annesley, 1st Earl of Anglesey, and his wife Elizabeth. He was educated at Magdalen College, Oxford, graduating M.A. in 1670-1 and B.D. in 1677 (incorporated at Cambridge 1678). He became Prebendary of Westminster in 1679, and Prebendary and then Dean of Exeter in 1681. In 1689 he became Vicar of Colyton Rawleigh, Devon.

In 1700 Annesley succeeded his nephew James as 3rd Baron Altham.

References

1655 births
1701 deaths
Deans of Exeter
Barons in the Peerage of Ireland
Richard
Younger sons of earls
Alumni of Magdalen College, Oxford